The McLaren MP4/15 was a Formula One car used by the McLaren-Mercedes team in the 2000 Formula One World Championship. The chassis was designed by Adrian Newey, Steve Nichols, Neil Oatley and Henri Durand with Mario Illien designing the bespoke Ilmor engine. The car proved highly competitive and scored seven victories just like its predecessor the MP4/14, but was narrowly beaten to both the Drivers' and Constructors' championships by the Ferrari F1-2000.

During the season, the team was deducted 10 constructors points at the Austrian Grand Prix after one of the FIA-mandated seals were found to be missing; no evidence of tampering was found.

McLaren used 'West' logos, except at the British and French Grands Prix where it used the respective drivers' first name.

Complete Formula One results
(key) (results in bold indicate pole position; results in italics indicate fastest lap) 

 – Hakkinen's win in Austria did not count towards Constructor's Championship points standings as FIA discovered post-race that a mandatory seal was missing from his car.

References

McLaren Formula One cars
2000 Formula One season cars